The Tiananmen, or Gate of Heavenly Peace, is the main entrance to the Imperial Palace Grounds in Beijing.

Tiananmen or Gate of Heavenly Peace may also refer to:

 Tiananmen Square
 Tiananmen Square protests, including:
 1976 Tiananmen Incident – the Tiananmen Square protests of 4–5 April 1976
 1989 Tiananmen Square protests and massacre (also known as Tiananmen Massacre)
 The Gate of Heavenly Peace (film), a documentary about the protests
 Tiananmen (film), a 2009 Chinese film
 The Gate of Heavenly Peace (book), by Jonathan D. Spence, about the revolutionary history of China